Miles Albion Netzel (May 12, 1886 – March 18, 1938) was a Major League Baseball third baseman who played for one season. He played in ten games for the Cleveland Naps during the 1909 Cleveland Naps season.

External links

1886 births
1938 deaths
Cleveland Naps players
Major League Baseball third basemen
Baseball players from Pennsylvania
North Yakima Braves players
Bloomington Bloomers players
Peoria Distillers players
Spokane Indians players
Portland Beavers players
Memphis Chickasaws players
Austin Senators players
Tacoma Tigers players
Portland Colts players
Regina Red Sox players
Ballard Pippins players
Victoria Bees players
Charleston Broom Corn Cutters players
Charleston Evangelists players
Staunton Speakers players